The Writers Guild Award for Best Written Comedy was an award presented from 1949 to 1984 by the Writers Guild of America, after which it was discontinued.

Winners & Nominees

Notes 

 The year indicates when the film was released. The awards were presented the following year.

1940s

1950s

1960s

1970s

1980s

References

External links 

 WGA.org

Writers Guild of America Awards
Awards established in 1949
1949 establishments in the United States
Awards disestablished in 1984
1984 disestablishments in the United States